Hasnat Ahmad Khan  (born 1 April 1958) is a British-Pakistani heart and lung surgeon. He is widely known for his romantic relationship with Diana, Princess of Wales, from 1995 to 1997.

Early life and education 
Khan was born on 1 April 1958 in Jhelum, a city in the Punjab province of Pakistan, in a Mohmand Pashtun family. He is the eldest of four children. His father, Rashid Khan, a graduate of the London School of Economics, ran a glass factory. Hasnat Khan is a distant cousin of Imran Khan, former prime minister of Pakistan.

Career
Until 1991 he worked in Sydney, Australia and then began to work in London. He served at the Royal Brompton Hospital in London from 1995 to 1996, then he began to work at the London Chest Hospital. In 2000, he worked at St Bart's hospital, after which he served at Harefield Hospital. In November 2007, he resigned from the post and began to head a cardiac hospital in Malaysia. As of August 2013, Khan is working as a consultant cardiothoracic surgeon at Basildon University Hospital.

Personal life

Relationship with the Princess of Wales
Khan had a two-year relationship with Diana, Princess of Wales, who is said to have described him as "Mr Wonderful." In May 1996, Diana visited the Khan family in Lahore. Diana's butler Paul Burrell said in testimony at her 2008 inquest that Diana described Khan as her soulmate. Diana ended the relationship in July 1997.

Diana's friends are reported to have described Hasnat as the "love of her life" and to have spoken of her distress when she ended their relationship. He, however, is said to be reticent about speaking of how much he may have meant to her or even how much she meant to him. Khan attended Diana's funeral ceremony at Westminster Abbey in September, 1997.

The heart surgeon told the police in 2004 that he doubted she had been pregnant when she died because she always took her contraceptive pills. In March 2008, Khan said in a written statement to Lord Justice Scott Baker's inquest into Diana's death that their relationship had begun in the late summer of 1995, and that although they had talked about getting married he believed that he would find the inevitable media attention "hell." Khan also said he believed the car crash which caused Diana's death was a tragic accident.

Marriage
Khan married 28-year-old Hadia Sher Ali in Pakistan, descended from Afghan royalty, in May 2006. In July 2008, Khan and Ali filed an application for divorce in the local arbitration council of Islamabad. Hasnat Khan is currently married to Somi Sohail.

In the media
The relationship between Khan and Diana, Princess of Wales is portrayed in the film Diana (2013), directed by Oliver Hirschbiegel and based on Kate Snell's book Diana: Her Last Love (2001). Khan is played by Naveen Andrews, while Diana is played by Naomi Watts.

Khan was portrayed by Pakistani actor Humayun Saeed in the fifth season of The Crown.

References

Living people
British cardiologists
Diana, Princess of Wales
Pakistani cardiologists
British physicians of Pakistani descent
People from Jhelum
People from Lahore
1958 births
British people of Pashtun descent